The Bofors 75 mm mountain gun was a Swedish designed and built mountain gun of the interwar years that was used during the Second World War.

Design
The Bofors 75 mm mountain gun was built in two main versions, one had a barrel of 20 calibers in length and the other a barrel of 22 calibers in length.  Both had a two-wheeled single-axle box-trail carriage with shield, which could be towed by a horse team or broken down into eight mule loads for transportation.  In addition to its use by Sweden it was widely exported.

Users

Photo gallery

Notes

Bibliography
 Christopher Foss: Jane's Pocket Book of Towed Artillery. New York. Collier Books. 1977.

External links
 http://www.quarryhs.co.uk/ammotable8.html

Bofors
75 mm artillery
Mountain artillery
World War II mountain artillery